The Philippines participated in the 2014 Asian Games in Incheon, South Korea, held from 19 September to 4 October 2014. For the first time since Bangkok at the 1998 Asian Games, the country produced only one gold medal in the history of the country's participation in the games.

Asian Games Performance
Daniel Caluag, a Filipino Olympian at the 2012 Summer Olympics, saved the Philippine team from the gold medal drought by winning the first place in the BMX cycling. This is also the Philippines' first gold medal in cycling in the entire history of Asian Games.

For the first time since 2002 (also held in South Korea), no Filipino boxer won the gold in a single Asian Games. Charly Suarez was beaten out by Mongolia's Otgondalai Dornjyambuu, in which the former settled for silver. The Philippine Basketball team was placed 7th, the poorest finish for the country in the history of Asian Games.

Ranked at No. 22 overall, the Philippines placed seventh behind Southeast Asian Asiad powerhouse Thailand, which is followed by Malaysia, Singapore, Indonesia, Myanmar and Vietnam. The Philippines is among the eight Southeast Asian teams to win at least one gold, with Cambodia winning its first gold medal and the only medal for that country in this games.

Medalists

Gold

Silver

Bronze

Medal summary

Medal by sports

Medal by Date

Archery

Men's

Women's

Athletics

Track events

Basketball

Men

Preliminary round

Group E

|}

Quarterfinals

Group H

|}

Classification round

Semifinals 5th−8th

7th place game

Bowling

Men

All events

Women

All events

Masters

Boxing

Canoeing

Men

Cycling

BMX

Road

Equestrian

Qualifications

Finals

Fencing

Men

Golf

Men

Women

Gymnastics

Artistic gymnastics

Men

Individual

Judo

Men

Women

Karate

Men

Women

Rowing

Men

Sailing

Softball

Women
Team
1.Veronica Belleza
4.Annalie Benjamen
6.Marlyn Francisco
8.Angelie Ursabia
9.Francesca Altomonte
10.Garnet Agnes Blando
11.Francesca Rose Foti
12.Lorna Adorable
14.Leia Ruiz
17.Luzviminda Embudo
30.Danielle Lindsey Gilmore
31.Gabrielle Elise Rodas
33.Morgan Teressa Janai Stuart
38.Rizza Bernardino
88.Elma Parohinog

All times are Korea Standard Time (UTC+09:00)

Preliminaries

Semifinals

Soft Tennis

Shooting

Men

Swimming

Men

Women

Taekwondo

Men

Women

Tennis

Triathlon

Weightlifting

Wrestling

Greco-Roman

Wushu

Men
Sanda

Taijiquan\Taijijian

Women
Sanda

References

Nations at the 2014 Asian Games
2014
Asian Games